Merry Christmas, Love is the ninth studio album by English singer Joss Stone. It was released by S-Curve Records on 30 September 2022.

Promotion
The album's first single, "What Christmas Means to Me", was released on September 7, 2022. "Bring on Christmas Day", an original song which was written and produced by Stone, was released as a promotional single on YouTube on September 16, 2022, followed by a lyric video for "Winter Wonderland" on September 30. A music video for "What Christmas Means to Me" premiered online on November 4, 2022.

Track listing
All tracks produced by Joss Stone.

Personnel 

Shawn Daugherty – assistant engineer
Chris Gehringer – mastering engineer 
Steve Greenwell – mixing engineer 
Charly Hutchings – producer assistant 
Dave Kalmusky – additional engineering 
Will Kinzle – assistant engineer
Nolan Knight – photographer
Stephen Lamb – additional orchestration

Tim Lauer – arranger
Dave Paulin  – assistant engineer
Katelyn Prieboy – assistant engineer
ST8MNT – graphic designer
Joss Stone – producer
Will Quinnell – assistant engineer
Howard Willing – additional engineering

Charts

Release history

References

Joss Stone albums
2022 Christmas albums
S-Curve Records albums